Karnaphuli Paper Mills is a Government-owned paper pulp and paper manufacturer in Chittagong, Bangladesh established in 1953 by Pakistan Industrial Development Corporation. In 1964 it was sold to Dawood Group. After the Independence of Bangladesh the company was taken over by Bangladesh Industrial Development Corporation. It is the largest paper producing factory in Bangladesh and operates as a subsidiary of Bangladesh Chemical Industries Corporation. In 2016, it has faced criticism for not having an effluent treatment facility.

History
Karnaphuli Paper Mills is a Government-owned paper pulp and paper manufacturer in Chittagong, Bangladesh established in 1953 by Pakistan Industrial Development Corporation.

In 1964 it was sold to Dawood Group. After the Independence of Bangladesh the company was taken over by Bangladesh Industrial Development Corporation.
As of 2016, it is the largest paper producing factory in Bangladesh and operates as a subsidiary of Bangladesh Chemical Industries Corporation.
In 2016, it faced criticism for not having an effluent treatment facility.

CEOs
 1952–1953: Christian Kaijser

References

Pulp and paper companies of Bangladesh
Government-owned companies of Bangladesh
Manufacturing companies based in Chittagong
Economy of Chittagong Division
Renewable resource companies established in 1953
Manufacturing companies established in 1953
Pakistani companies established in 1953